Lypothora walsinghamii is a species of moth of the family Tortricidae. It is found in Chile.

References

Moths described in 1883
Polyorthini
Endemic fauna of Chile